The Svrljiški Timok (Serbian Cyrillic: , "Timok of Svrljig") is a river in Serbia, headwater of the Beli Timok. It rises north of the Mountains of Svrljig near the village of Šesti Gabar at elevation 1,078 m and flows to the west, curving around the northern slopes of the Mountains of Svrljig. It passes through many villages (Vlagovo, Manojlica, Guševac, Lozan, Okruglica, Crnoljevica, Beloinje), reaching the town of Svrljig, that gives its name to the river, which here gently turns to the north, and after passing through Niševac and Varoš makes a complete turn to the north-east. It runs through Palilula, Podvis and Rgošte, reaching Knjaževac, where it meets the Trgoviški Timok and together they form the Beli Timok.

Tributaries

The tributaries of the Svrljiški Timok are:

Left: Turija, Prazačkka, Kalnicka, Bela,  Dolčina, Rakinak, Glogovačka, Grazinska

Right: Izvorska, Rgoški

References 

Rivers of Serbia
Timok Valley